Northeast High School is a public high school located at 415 Van Brunt Boulevard in Kansas City, Missouri, next to Northeast Middle School. It is part of the Kansas City Public Schools.

History
Its interior was renovated in 1988 and a new gymnasium, weight room, and locker rooms were constructed on its south side.

Athletics
The school's several sports teams are called the Vikings.

State championships

Notable alumni
 William S. Sessionsattorney, jurist, United States district judge, and FBI Director
 Clarence M. Kelleynicknamed "Chief" with .300 baseball batting average, former Chief of the Kansas City, Missouri Police Department and second FBI Director

References

High schools in Kansas City, Missouri
Public high schools in Missouri